The Wye Bridge is a Grade I listed stone bridge in Hereford, the county town of Herefordshire in England. Spanning the River Wye, it was constructed in 1490 to replace an earlier timber bridge dating back to the twelfth century. During the 1645 Siege of Hereford in the English Civil War it was the scene of heavy fighting between the English Royalist defenders and the Scottish Covenanter besiegers. A gatehouse that stood on the site was severely damaged and was later demolished in the eighteenth century.

References

Bibliography
 Foxton, Derek & Shoesmith, Ron. Hereford in 50 Buildings. Amberley Publishing Limited,  2019.
 Hurley, Heather. The Old Roads of South Herefordshire. Fineleaf Editions, 2007.

Bridges in Herefordshire
Bridges across the River Wye
Rebuilt buildings and structures in the United Kingdom
1490 establishments in England
Bridges completed in 1490
Grade I listed bridges